Hart is the name of a village in Austria. It is part of the Gemeinde Lavamünd. It has an average altitude of 630 metres (2083 ft).

Cities and towns in Wolfsberg District